Richland Hall is a historic building in Nashville, Tennessee, USA. It was completed in 1894.

History
The three-story red brick building was completed in 1894. It was built by James A. Bowling, whose money came from the sale of prison farmland. The West Nashville Masonic Lodge was founded there in 1898. The building was used by the Freemasons from 1901 to 1915. In the 1920s, rooms on the third floor were rented as the Richland Hall Hotel.

The building was listed on the National Register of Historic Places in 1983.

References

Clubhouses on the National Register of Historic Places in Tennessee
Buildings and structures completed in 1894
Buildings and structures in Nashville, Tennessee
Former Masonic buildings in Tennessee
National Register of Historic Places in Nashville, Tennessee